Redart is an unincorporated community in Mathews County, in the U. S. state of Virginia. The name is a reversal of Trader, the name of an early settler.

See also
 List of geographic names derived from anagrams and ananyms

References

Unincorporated communities in Virginia
Unincorporated communities in Mathews County, Virginia